The Stargard Shaker (German name: Stargarder Zitterhals, French name: Trembleur de Stargard), also called  Zitterhall (sg. 'trembling neck pigeon', Zitterhälse, pl. 'trembling necks'), is a breed of fancy pigeon developed over many years of selective breeding. Originally developed in Pomerania. Zitterhals have curved swan-like necks that tremble or shake in a way similar to Fantail pigeons. A Zitterhals pigeon was one of the champions at the 2007 NPA Grand Nationals.

See also
 List of pigeon breeds

References

Pigeon breeds
Pigeon breeds originating in Germany